The Android is the tenth book in the Animorphs series, written by K.A. Applegate. It is narrated by Marco.

Plot summary
While sneaking into a concert in dog morph, Jake and Marco discover that they are unable to detect a smell from their friend Erek King, something impossible, as all living things smell (Marco describes Erek as a "black hole of smell"). They then realize that he is also a member of The Sharing. When the Animorphs investigate further, they find out that he is really an android with a hologram projected around him, after he is hit by a bus and his hologram fails for a few seconds.

Marco finds out from Tom that there is a barbecue for The Sharing going on at a nearby lake, and the Animorphs go there to find out whether Erek is working for the Yeerks. Only certain animals can see through Erek's hologram, so Ax and Marco morph wolf spiders, while the rest of the Animorphs go into their bird morphs (except Jake, who morphs a fly) to act as lookouts. While in morph, Marco and Ax confirm their suspicion that Erek is an android. However, Marco is then grabbed by a bird, who tries to eat him. He is forced to demorph in full view of Erek. Erek projects a hologram around him, so he is hidden from the Controllers. Erek tells Marco to come visit him at his house, and to bring the other Animorphs.

After some thought, the Animorphs decide to go. In case it's a trap, they leave Rachel behind, who will morph into grizzly bear and storm the place if Ax thought-speaks a distress call. Once they get there, Erek reveals he is part of an ancient race of androids called the Chee, whose creators, the Pemalites, were destroyed by the Howlers thousands of years ago. The Chee managed to escape to Earth with a few of the last remaining Pemalites (which resembled humanoid canines), and fused their essence with wolves, creating dogs. A few members of the Chee are working against the Yeerks. Erek agreed to "become" a Controller, but in reality he controls his Yeerk. When he goes to the Yeerk Pool, he simply projects a hologram of the Yeerk going in and out of his ear, realizing that the Yeerks have very little ability to communicate while in the pool.

The Chee have amazing physical strength, but they have one drawback: their programming means they cannot hurt anyone. Erek tells the Animorphs that they can change their programming with the Pemalite crystal. They find out that the Yeerks are currently in possession of the crystal, and have it in a high security facility. They agree to attempt to retrieve the crystal so the Chee can join the fight.

To get it, they decide to sneak in using cockroach and spider morphs. They are chased by a rat and just barely escape being burned by a furnace, but they reach the highly guarded room. They morph into bats to echolocate and avoid the complex wiring that protects the crystal from normal means. However, once Jake has the crystal in his mouth, the Animorphs realize that he can't echolocate out of there. They go into battle morphs and race out, where they are stopped by twenty Hork-Bajir warriors. Marco sees Erek outside the windows looking in, powerless to help them. During the fighting, Marco ends up by the windows. Gasping, he smashes the window and gives the Pemalite crystal to Erek before dying.

When Erek delivers an electric shock to Marco's heart and he comes to, Marco realizes that all of the Hork-Bajir are dead, and the Animorphs and Erek are fine, Erek having massacred the Hork-Bajir. Erek says that he has realized why the Pemalites put the pacifist programming in him—as his memory remains perfect, Erek will never be able to move past the memory of the violence that he has committed and will constantly remember it as though it just took place—and changes his programming back to what it was. He says that he can never join the actual fight, but he can pass on information. He gives Marco a phone number for a safe, untappable line so they can communicate. At the end of the book, Homer, Jake's dog, drops the Pemalite crystal into the ocean.

Morphs

Android, The
Holography in fiction
1997 American novels
1997 science fiction novels
Novels about androids